In general Counties Manukau refers to the southern area of Auckland, New Zealand. However there are no universally agreed boundaries. Organisations that use the term in their name include:

The Counties Manukau Rugby Union, a provincial rugby union
The Counties Manukau rugby league team, a rugby league team
The Counties Manukau cricket team, which competes in the Hawke Cup
The Counties Manukau District Health Board, a district health board
The Counties Manukau Police District, a policing district